The Fieldmaster 121 series is a .22 caliber, slide action, tubular magazine-fed rifle manufactured by Remington Arms between 1936 and 1954.
The Sportmaster 121 has a 25" barrel, a one piece hardwood stock, and a blued metal finish. It was replaced by the Model 572 Fieldmaster in 1955.

Variants
 121A Standard
 121D Peerless
 121E Expert
 121F Premier
 121ES
 121FS
 121SB Smooth Bore
 121S Special Grade

References

External links
 Remington Manufacture Dates

Pump-action rifles
Remington Arms firearms
.22 LR rifles